Antonio del Pollaiuolo (17 January 1429/14334 February 1498), also known as Antonio di Jacopo Pollaiuolo or Antonio Pollaiuolo (also spelled Pollaiolo), was an Italian painter, sculptor, engraver, and goldsmith during the Italian Renaissance.

Biography

He was born in Florence. His brother, Piero del Pollaiuolo, was also an artist, and the two frequently worked together. Their work shows both classical influences and an interest in human anatomy; reportedly, the brothers carried out dissections to improve their knowledge of the subject. They took their nickname from the trade of their father, who in fact sold poultry (pollaio meaning "hen coop" in Italian). Antonio's first studies of goldsmithing and metalworking were under either his father or Andrea del Castagno: the latter probably taught him also in painting. Other sources relate that he worked in the Florentine workshop of Bartoluccio di Michele, where Lorenzo Ghiberti also received his training. During this time, he also took an interest in engraving.

Some of Pollaiuolo's painting exhibits strong brutality, of which the characteristics can be studied in his portrayal of Saint Sebastian, painted in 1473–1475 for the Pucci Chapel of the SS. Annunziata. However, in contrast, his female portraits exhibit a calmness and a meticulous attention to detail of fashion, as was the norm in late fifteenth-century portraiture.

He achieved his greatest successes as a sculptor and metal-worker. The exact ascription of his works is doubtful, as his brother Piero did much in collaboration with him. The fifteenth-century addition of the infant twins Romulus and Remus to an existing bronze sculpture of the Ancient Roman mythological she-wolf who nursed them has been attributed by some to him.

He only produced one surviving engraving, the Battle of the Nude Men, but both in its size and sophistication this took the Italian print to new levels, and remains one of the most famous prints of the Renaissance.

In 1484 Antonio took up residence in Rome, where he executed the tomb of Pope Sixtus IV, now in the Museum of St. Peter's (finished in 1493), a composition in which he again manifested the quality of exaggeration in the anatomical features of the figures. In 1496 he went to Florence in order to put the finishing touches to the work already begun in the sacristy of Santo Spirito.
He died in Rome as a rich man, having just finished his mausoleum of Pope Innocent VIII, also in St. Peter's, and was buried in the church of San Pietro in Vincoli, where a monument was raised to him near that of his brother.

His main contribution to Florentine painting lay in his analysis of the human body in movement or under conditions of strain, but he is also important for his pioneering interest in landscape. His students included Sandro Botticelli.

Major works

Paintings

The Assumption of St Mary Magdalene (c. 1460) – Tempera on panel, Museo della Pala del Pollaiolo, Staggia Senese
Altarpiece for the Chapel of the Cardinal of Portugal (1467) – Fresco, San Miniato al Monte, Florence
Portrait of a Young Woman (c. 1465) – Poplar panel, 52.5 × 36.2 cm, Staatliche Museen, Berlin
The Saints Vincent, James and Eustace (1468) – Tempera on wood, 172 × 179 cm, Uffizi, Florence
Apollo and Daphne (1470–1480) – Tempera on wood, 30 × 20 cm, National Gallery, London
Portrait of a Young Woman (c. 1475) – Tempera on wood, 55 × 34 cm, Uffizi, Florence
Hercules and the Hydra (c. 1475) – Tempera on wood, 17 × 12 cm, Uffizi, Florence
Hercules and Antaeus (c. 1478) – Tempera on wood, 16 × 9 cm, Uffizi, Florence
Portrait of a Girl  – Panel, Museo Poldi Pezzoli, Milan
Hercules and Deianira  – Oil on canvas, Yale University Art Gallery, New Haven

Sculptures

St Christopher and the Infant Christ – Metropolitan Museum of Art, New York 
Hercules (1475) – Bode Museum, Berlin
Tomb of Pope Sixtus IV (1493) – St. Peter's Basilica

Engraving

Notes

References
Giorgio Vasari includes a biography of Pollaiuolo in his Lives of the Artists.

External links

Leonardo da Vinci, Master Draftsman, exhibition catalog fully online as PDF from the Metropolitan Museum of Art, which contains material on Antonio del Pollaiuolo (see index)
The Gubbio Studiolo and its conservation, volumes 1 & 2, from The Metropolitan Museum of Art Libraries (fully available online as PDF), which contains material on Antonio del Pollaiuolo (see index)

Italian Renaissance painters
Italian Renaissance sculptors
Painters from Florence
Sculptors from Florence
Quattrocento painters
15th-century births
1498 deaths
Italian goldsmiths
Italian male sculptors
Italian printmakers
Burials at San Pietro in Vincoli
15th-century people of the Republic of Florence
15th-century Italian painters
15th-century Italian sculptors
15th-century engravers
Catholic painters
Catholic decorative artists
Catholic engravers
Catholic sculptors
Sibling artists